Teine may refer to:
Teine-ku, Sapporo, an administrative district of the city of Sapporo, Hokkaidō, Japan
Teine Station, a railway station in Teine-ku, Sapporo, Japan
Sapporo Teine, a ski resort and amusement park in Teine-ku, Sapporo, Japan

See also
Theine